Albino Bernardini (18 October 1917 – 31 March 2015) was an Italian writer and pedagogue.

Born in  Siniscola, Nuoro, Bernardini devoted his life to pedagogy, and was author of dozens of books, mostly fairy tales and children's stories. He  was best known for the semi-autobiographical novels Le Bacchette di Lula ("The Lula's chopsticks"), which was translated into 26 languages, and Un anno a Pietralata ("A year in Pietralata"), which was adapted into a film, Diario di un maestro, directed in 1972  by Vittorio De Seta. He also collaborated with several newspapers and magazines. In 2005 Bernardini received an honorary degree in  primary education at the Cagliari University.

References

Further reading

External links 
 

1917 births
2015 deaths
People from the Province of Nuoro
20th-century Italian male writers
Italian educational theorists
20th-century Italian novelists